Hulail ibn Hubshiyyah ibn Salul ibn Ka‘b ibn ‘Amr al-Khuza‘i was the Chief of Banu Khuza'ah who gave his heiress-daughter Hubbah in marriage to Qurayshi Chief Qusai ibn Kilab. From this marriage would descend Muhammad.

References 

Year of birth missing
Year of death missing
Family of Muhammad
5th-century Arabs